was a city located in Fukuoka Prefecture, Japan. The city was founded on April 1, 1954.

As of 2003, the city had an estimated population of 11,367 and the density of 515.51 persons per km². The total area was 22.05 km².

On March 27, 2006, Yamada, along with the towns of Inatsuki, Kaho and Usui (all from Kaho District), was merged to create the city of Kama.

External links
 Kama official website 

Dissolved municipalities of Fukuoka Prefecture
Populated places established in 1954
Populated places disestablished in 2006
2006 disestablishments in Japan